Patrick Henry "Cozy" Dolan (December 3, 1872 – March 29, 1907) was an American professional baseball right fielder. He played in Major League Baseball (MLB) for the Boston Beaneaters, Chicago Orphans, Brooklyn Superbas, Chicago White Sox and Cincinnati Reds between 1895 and 1906. Born in Cambridge, Massachusetts, he fell ill during spring training in 1907 and died in Louisville, Kentucky of typhoid fever soon afterwards.

See also
 List of baseball players who died during their careers

References

External links

1872 births
1907 deaths
Major League Baseball right fielders
19th-century baseball players
Boston Beaneaters players
Brooklyn Superbas players
Chicago Orphans players
Cincinnati Reds players
Chicago White Sox players
Baseball players from Massachusetts
Providence Grays (minor league) players
Philadelphia Athletics (minor league) players
Reading Actives players
Springfield Ponies players
Springfield Maroons players
New Haven Blues players
Deaths from typhoid fever